The New England Rugby Union, or NERU, is the governing body for the sport of rugby union within the District of  New England (New South Wales) in Australia. It is a member of the New South Wales Country Rugby Union.

History

Clubs

First-grade clubs 

  The Armidale Rugby Club (Blues)
  Barbarians R.U.F.C.
  Robb Rugby Club - https://archive.today/20130101010711/http://robbrugby.rugbynet.com.au/
  St Alberts College
  Tamworth Rugby Union Sporting Club

Lower-grade clubs 

  Glen Innes
  Tenterfield Bumblebees

Former NERU clubs 
Armidale City
Armidale Old Boys
City United (1994-2002)
Earle Page College (1964-1984 and 1989–1990)
Guy Fawkes Ebor
Guyra Ghosts
Gwydir River Rats (Bingara)
Hillgrove
Page-Wright Barbarians (1985-1988)
Teachers College (TC) - The Chalkies
University College
United Colleges - The Dirty Ducks (1974–93)
Uralla Miners
Walcha Rams
Wright College Redmen (1958–73,1989–94, 2015- ) 

City-United Historical note:  During the 1994 pre-season, it became clear that neither United nor Armidale City would have enough players to field four grades or be competitive. Given that quite a few of City's squad were former United players, NERU Secretary and former United President Dick Croft encouraged the two clubs to join forces, and City United was born. The new club competed strongly for the next eight years before merging with Armidale Old Boys for the 2003 season. This resulted in the new Armidale Blues Rugby Club, which combines the history and tradition of City, the professionalism and competitiveness of Old Boys, and the spirit and student depth of United.

See also

Rugby union in New South Wales

References

External links
 
 

Rugby union governing bodies in New South Wales
New England (New South Wales)